Gaff may refer to:

Ankle-worn devices
 Spurs in variations of cockfighting
 Climbing spikes used to ascend wood poles, such as utility poles

Arts and entertainment
 A character in the Blade Runner film franchise
 Penny gaff, a 19th-century English variety show
 A magician's trick prop, such as a fake sword, used to imitate sword swallowing
 A character in the Eon Kid animated series

Pole-shaped devices
 Fishing gaff, a pole used in fishing
 Gaff rig, a fore-and-aft sailing arrangement in which the sail is held up by a spar called a gaff
 Hakapik, or gaff, used as a seal-hunting weapon

Other uses
 Operation Gaff, 1944 military mission of assassination
 Gaff (clothing), an item worn as means of concealing genitalia
 Gaff (surname), for people with the surname
 GAFF or "generalized AMBER force field", a set of parameters used in simulating the interactions of small organic molecules

See also
 Gaf, an Arabic letter
 Gaffe, an embarrassing error
 Gaffer tape or gaff tape, a form of sticky tape
 Gaffer (disambiguation)